Battery Kingman is an artillery emplacement at Fort Hancock, New Jersey. The Battery was named after Dan Christie Kingman (March 6, 1852 – November 14, 1916) an officer in the United States Army who served as Chief of Engineers from 1913 to 1916.

History

WWI
In the start of the 20th century changing technology meant that battleships out-ranged land based gun batteries. Brigadier General Dan C. Kingman saw this threat and had ordered the United States Army Corps of Engineers to design a new barbette carriage. To out-range battleships, the Model 1917 Barbette carriage, was introduced. He died, in 1916, during the design process so one of the Fort Hancock Batteries was named in his honor.

In 1917 construction began on two 12-inch gun M1895 at Fort Hancock with two guns each on long-range barbette carriages; these were completed in 1921 and named Battery Kingman and Battery Mills.

WWII
The rise of air power meant static ground defences like Battery Kingman were vulnerable to air attack. Batteries Kingman and Mills were modernized to meet this threat and their guns were protected from aerial bombing by the addition of thick concrete walls and roofs making it a casemate or fortified gun emplacement or armored structure from which guns are fired. In addition, several anti-aircraft gun batteries were installed in Fort Hancock.

Bibliography 
Notes

References 
  - Total pages: 64 

 
     
Hancock
Military installations in New Jersey 
National Historic Landmarks in New Jersey
Military and war museums in New Jersey
Sandy Hook, New Jersey 
Middletown Township, New Jersey
National Register of Historic Places in Monmouth County, New Jersey
1917 establishments in New Jersey
1974 disestablishments in New Jersey
Historic districts on the National Register of Historic Places in New Jersey
Closed installations of the United States Army
Military history of New York City
Military installations established in 1917
Military installations closed in 1974